The Shameless (lit. "A Thug" or "A Rogue") is a 2015 South Korean film starring Kim Nam-gil and Jeon Do-yeon. It is written and directed by Oh Seung-uk, who described it as a "hardboiled romantic noir thriller.

The Shameless made its world premiere in the Un Certain Regard section of the 2015 Cannes Film Festival.

Plot
The police are staking out Park Joon-gil for the murder of Hwang Choong-nam, and jaded detective Jung Jae-gon is being pressured to close the case, particularly by his former superior Moon Ki-beom, who lost his badge for corruption. Joon-gil was once the mob enforcer for Jay Investment, but had fallen out of favor when he embezzled and stole the heart of Kim Hye-kyung, the girlfriend of the company's vice president Park Jong-ho. Jay Investment representative Min Young-ki approaches Jae-gon and offers him  to ensure that Joon-gil is maimed during the arrest as payback. Jae-gon reluctantly agrees, but a botched arrest sends Joon-gil on the run, and Jae-gon decides the best way to find him again is by sticking with Hye-kyung, hoping she will lead him to the fugitive. Hye-kyung now works as a bar hostess to pay off her substantial debt to Jong-ho, and Jae-gon threatens his way into an undercover job as a floor manager at the nightclub she works at. Introducing himself as Joon-gil's former cellmate Lee Young-joon, Jae-gon begins to spend time with the suspicious Hye-kyung and gradually wins her trust. But when Joon-gil returns asking Hye-kyung for money for a potential deal, Jae-gon's newfound feelings of love and jealousy rise to the surface.

Cast

Kim Nam-gil as Jung Jae-gon
Jeon Do-yeon as Kim Hye-kyung
Park Sung-woong as Park Joon-gil
Kwak Do-won as Moon Ki-beom
Kim Min-jae as Min Young-ki
Oh Ha-nee as Son Min-ji
Park Ji-hwan as Son Kyung-soo
Choi Young-do as Kim Ho-gil
Ha Ji-eun as Han Ji-yeon
Kang Tae-young as Kim Jin-hyung
Ji Seung-hyun as Kim Dong-soo
Chu Gwi-jeong as Strange woman
Sung Seung-hyun as Drug addict
Shin Sam-bong as Shopkeeper
Ji Goon-woo as Drug dealer
Lee Dong-jin as Hwang Choong-nam
Yoo Ji-yeon as Hwang's lover
Jung Jae-woong as Kim Hyung-seok
Yoon Seung-won as Park Jong-ho
Jo Won-hee as Deok-ryong

Production
This is the second film Oh Seung-uk has directed, 15 years after his directorial debut Kilimanjaro (2000). Oh was a prominent screenwriter in the 1990s, having written Green Fish (1997) and Christmas in August (1998).

Lee Jung-jae was originally cast in the leading role as Jung Jae-gon, but dropped out after he was injured on the set of his 2014 film Big Match. He was replaced by Kim Nam-gil.

The Shameless began filming in June 2014.

Box office
The Shameless was released on May 27, 2015. It opened at fourth place in the box office, grossing  from 272,000 admissions in its first five days. By the end of its run, it had grossed  from 413,836 admissions.

Awards and nominations

References

External links
 

2015 films
2015 crime films
2010s romance films
South Korean crime films
South Korean romance films
2010s Korean-language films
2010s South Korean films
Romantic crime films